Gleboceras is a globular goniatitid from the upper Carboniferous of the Urals, named by Ruzhentsev, 1950, tentatively assigned to the Thalassoceratidae, and placed in the subfamily Gleboceratinae.  The ventral (outer marginal) lobe is moderately wide, with parallel sides. The lateral lobe is serrate.

References

 GONIAT Genus Gleboceras
 Mesozoic Ammonoidea, Treatise on Invertebrate Paleontology Part L, 1957. Geological Society of America.
 Gleboceras in the Paleobiology Database.

Goniatitida genera
Thalassoceratoidea
Pennsylvanian ammonites
Fossils of Russia